Sphingobacterium ginsenosidimutans is a Gram-negative, aerobic, non-spore-forming, rod-shaped and non-motile bacterium from the genus of Sphingobacterium which has been isolated from a ginseng field in Pocheon in Korea.

References

Sphingobacteriia
Bacteria described in 2014